Linklater may refer to:


People
Andrew Linklater (born 1949), international relations academic
Andro Linklater (1944–2013), Scottish writer and historian
Eric Linklater (1899–1974), Scottish writer and military historian
Frederick Harvie Linklater (c. 1849–1937), Australian writer and lawyer
Hamish Linklater (born 1976), American actor, son of Kristin
Joseph Linklater (1876–1961), New Zealand politician
Kristin Linklater (born 1936), actor and theatre director
Magnus Linklater (born 1942), Scottish journalist
Marjorie Linklater (1909–1997), Scottish campaigner of the arts and environment
Richard Linklater (born 1960), American film director and screenwriter

Places
Linklater, Manitoba, Canada
Linklater, Orkney, a place in Okney, Scotland

Other
Linklaters, international law firm

See also 
 Linkletter (disambiguation)